The Cyprus men's national basketball team represents Cyprus in international basketball, and is controlled by the Cyprus Basketball Federation. The national team is coached by Christophoros Livadiotis.

Cyprus joined FIBA in 1974, where the team has mostly competed in smaller competitions such as the Games of the Small States of Europe, winning it nine times. However, Cyprus will make their debut at the top continental competition, EuroBasket, as co-hosts in 2025.

History
Cyprus made its first appearance on the international scene in qualification for EuroBasket 1983. Although the national team would come up short in their attempt, with an (0–4) record. Furthermore, Cyprus has taken part at lower level tournaments, where they have been impressive. Cyprus has won two bronze medals, and two silver medals at the European Championship for Small Countries, while also taking home one bronze, two silver, and nine gold medals at the Games of the Small States of Europe.

During the first few decades on the international level for Cyprus, the national team went through multiple futile qualifying cycles which saw the team unable to successfully qualify for the EuroBasket. For qualification to EuroBasket 2017, Cyprus was placed into Group A during the qualifiers; although the team would once again be rebuffed at reaching the continental stage. Cyprus would ultimately finish up with a (2–4) record, with their only two victories coming against Switzerland.

Cyrus took part in qualifying for EuroBasket 2022, and was drawn into Group C for the first round of pre-qualifiers. The first test for the national team was against Portugal, at home in Nicosia. Cyprus would eventually prevail, in a tough match 69–67. Looking to stay perfect, the team played their next match on the road at Luxembourg. Immediately, Cyprus would run out to a big first quarter lead, and never looked back, winning 53–67. Cyprus dropped their final two matches of group play, to finish with a (2–2) record to advance.

During the second round of pre-qualifiers, Cyprus was placed into Group D, with Austria, and Great Britain. However, the national team failed to win a match, and finished with an (0–4) record. Cyprus blew an opportunity to advance to the final stage of qualifiers, but would have one more chance to make amends in the third round.

Heading into the final window of pre-qualifiers, Cyprus needed to finish top of Group F, if they were to achieve their goal. Unfortunately, the team would duplicate the results attained in the second round, with an (0–4) record once again. Cyprus ended the pre-qualifying process at a record of (2–10) overall, eliminating their opportunity to advance. After failing to qualify for EuroBasket 2022, Cyprus went through European Pre-Qualifiers for the 2023 FIBA World Cup. However, they finished (1–5) during the first round to be eliminated.

In March 2022, Cyprus finally qualified for the EuroBasket, by being awarded one of the co-hosts for the group stage at EuroBasket 2025. Matches will be played at the Spyros Kyprianou Athletic Center in Limassol.

Competitive record

FIBA World Cup

Olympic Games

Games of the Small States of Europe

EuroBasket

Championship for Small Countries

Team

Current roster
Roster for the EuroBasket 2025 Pre-Qualifiers matches on 23 and 26 February 2023 against Portugal and Romania.

Depth chart

Head coach position
 Christos Stylianidis – (2007–2011)
 Antonis Konstantinides – (2012)
 Panagiotis Yiannaras – (2013–2017)
 Linos Gavriel – (2017–2021)
 Michael Matsentides – (2022 Interim)
 Christophoros Livadiotis – (2022–present)

Results and fixtures

2021

2022

2023

Kit

Manufacturer
2012–2015: Champion
2015–2018: LEGEA
2019–present: Caan Athletics

See also

Sport in Cyprus
Cyprus women's national basketball team
Cyprus men's national under-20 basketball team
Cyprus men's national under-18 basketball team
Cyprus men's national under-16 basketball team

Notes

References

External links

Official website 
Cyprus FIBA profile
Cyprus National Team – Men at Eurobasket.com
Cyprus Basketball Records at FIBA Archive

Videos
 Cyprus v Iceland - Highlights - FIBA EuroBasket 2017 Qualifiers Youtube.com video

Basketball in Cyprus
National basketball teams, Cyprus
Men's national basketball teams
Basketball national team, Cyprus
1974 establishments in Cyprus